Miss Puerto Rico is a national beauty pageant in Puerto Rico. Currently, there are two separate televised pageants held annually: Miss Universe Puerto Rico to select the representative for Miss Universe and Miss Mundo de Puerto Rico to select the representative for Miss World. Additionally, the Miss Puerto Rico Scholarship Organization selects the representative for Miss America.

Big Four pageants
Puerto Rico has been represented in the Big Four international beauty pageants, the four major international beauty pageants for women. These are Miss World, Miss Universe, Miss International, and Miss Earth.

Miss Universe

History
In its various forms, the "Miss Puerto Rico" beauty pageant has been held almost every year since the 1930s. The winner of the contest represents Puerto Rico at the Miss Universe pageant each year.

The selection of Miss Puerto Rico commences the year before the winner advances to participate in the Miss Universe pageant. Each Puerto Rican city may choose a representative who then enters the Miss Puerto Rico finals, traditionally held at a San Juan area hotel. The winner is crowned at the conclusion of the final competition.

There have been three changes in the organization that led to modifications in the pageant's name. "Miss Puerto Rico" was held from 1952 until 1998 under the direction of Anna Santisteban, in 1996 the pageant lost the franchise for Miss Universe. From 1996 to 1998 Telemundo organized the event, under the name "Miss Universe Puerto Rico". From 1999 to 2002 TeleOnce (now Univision Puerto Rico) obtained the franchise and renamed it "Miss Puerto Rico Universe". Magali Febles organized the pageant between 2003 and 2009 and the pageant title has remained the same. In 2009, Luisito Vigoreaux and Desireé Lowry obtained the Miss Universe franchise and renamed the pageant "Miss Universe Puerto Rico". In 2018, WAPA-TV obtained the Miss Universe Puerto Rico franchise and placed Denise Quiñones as the pageant director.  The Miss Puerto Rico beauty pageant has now turned to technology to reach more people through the use of podcasting. Starting with the 2006 pageant, Miss Puerto Rico Universe became the first pageant of the Miss Universe franchise to have a podcast. In this, Wilton Vargas, an international multi-media and technology personality, interviews all contestants with the goal of helping people get to know them better so that they can participate in the voting process using cell phones. This podcast is published as a section in technology news and information website Tecnetico.com and various podcast directories, including iTunes.

Delegates are allowed to compete more than once at the Miss Puerto Rico Universe pageant, the caveat being that they are not allowed to compete again after they have won. For example, Cynthia Olavarría placed 1st runner-up in 2003 and returned in 2005, winning the title and placing 1st runner-up at Miss Universe. A number of delegates and winners have competed in the "Miss Mundo de Puerto Rico" (Miss World Puerto Rico) pageant, a preliminary to the Miss World pageant. There are frequently crossovers between the two pageants: for example Joyce Giraud was crowned Miss Puerto Rico twice by Ana Rosa Brito, first in 1994 as Miss Mundo de Puerto Rico, then in 1998 as Miss Universe Puerto Rico.

Puerto Rico is one of the most successful competitors in the history of the Miss Universe pageant, having won five times. Marisol Malaret, Miss Puerto Rico 1970, was the first Puerto Rican to win the Miss Universe title. The four other Puerto Rican delegates who have won the Miss Universe title are Deborah Carthy-Deu (1985), Dayanara Torres (1993), Denise Quiñones (2001), and Zuleyka Rivera (2006).

On November 7, 2011, Miss Universe Puerto Rico selected the first woman who was not born in Puerto Rico to represent the island at Miss Universe 2012. Bodine Koehler Peña was crowned as Miss Universe Puerto Rico 2012. Koehler was born in the Netherlands to a Dutch father and a Dominican mother, but grew up in Puerto Rico.

Representatives
For a complete list of the representatives to Miss Universe

Color Key

Winners gallery

Miss World

History
Puerto Rico debuted in Miss World in 1959, then was absent from 1960 to 1969. In 1970 a new organization took the responsibility of sending contestants until 1985 via castings. Puerto Rico did not compete in Miss World from 1986 to 1988. The Miss Puerto Rico organization, directed by Anna Santisteban, obtained the Miss World franchise in 1989, Tania Collazo was her first Miss World delegate. Santisteban produced Miss World PR until 1995.

In 1996, Delia Cruz, mother of Miss World Wilnelia Merced Cruz, obtained the franchise and began organizing the Miss Mundo de Puerto Rico pageant with Tania Collazo as organizer for a few years before Desiree Lowry and later on Shanira Blanco. Winners have been competing ever since in the international pageant. Puerto Rico has produced two winners (1975,2016), two 2nd runners-up (2005, 2011) and ten semi-finalists (1976, 1978, 1980, 1985, 2002, 2003, 2006, 2007, 2008, 2010), and one quarter-finalist (2012).

Representatives
For a complete list of the representatives to Miss World

Color Key

Gallery of Miss World representatives

Miss Earth

History

The Miss Puerto Rico Universe organization sent representatives to Miss Earth between 2001–2004 under Magaly Febles. From 2005 to 2013 Puerto Rico's representative to Miss Earth was selected through the Miss Puerto Rico Earth pageant. Under the direction of  Shanira Blancoin 2014 the representative was selected through the Miss Mundo de Puerto Rico pageant with the 1st Runner-Up being sent to Miss Earth. however, Puerto Rico dod not send a representative in 2015.

Representatives
For a complete list of the representatives to Miss Earth 

Color Key

Miss International

The first Puerto Rican delegate in Miss International was Carmen Sara Látimer, sent in 1960. Since 1960, Puerto Rico has produced two winners (Laurie Simpson in 1987 and Valerie Hernandez in 2014), one 3rd runner-up and ten semi-finalists. The Miss Puerto Rico pageant had the Miss International franchise from 1960 to 1997, after a two-year hiatus, a new pageant was created called Miss Puerto Rico Turismo that sent representatives until 2007 when a new organization acquired the franchise (Creative Options Inc. – Fernando Oquendo Vega).

Representatives
For a complete list of the representatives to Miss International

Color Key

Winners gallery

This is a list of  Puerto Rico's official representatives and their placements at the Big Four international beauty pageants, considered the most important in the world.

Hundreds of beauty pageants are conducted yearly, but the Big Four are considered the most prestigious, widely covered and broadcast by media. The Wall Street Journal, BBC News, CNN, Xinhua News Agency, and global news agencies such as Reuters and Agence France-Presse collectively refer to the four major pageants as "Big Four" namely: Miss Universe, Miss World, Miss International and Miss Earth.

The country has won in all four pageants with a total of  ten victories:
 Five —  Miss Universe crowns (1970 • 1985 • 1993 • 2001 • 2006)
 Two  — Miss World crowns (1975 • 2016)
 Two  — Miss International crowns (1987 • 2014)
 One  — Miss Earth crown (2019)

Current franchise holders
The franchise holders in Puerto Rico of the four major beauty pageants are the following:

WAPA-TV — Miss Universe Puerto Rico
Ana Aviles — Miss World Puerto Rico
Fernando Vega — Miss International Puerto Rico
Vanessa De Roide — Miss Earth Puerto Rico

Puerto Rico's Big Four titleholders
Color key

× Did not compete
↑ No pageant held

Crossovers
Miss Universe
2019 - Madison Anderson (1st Runner-Up)
2016 - Brenda Jiménez 
2014 - Gabriela Berrios 
2008 - Ingrid Marie Rivera 
1998 - Joyce Giraud (2nd Runner-Up)
1997 - Ana Rosa Brito (Top 10)
1994 - Brenda Robles 
1993 - Dayanara Torres (WINNER)
1987 - Laurie Simpson (4th Runner-Up)
1986 - Elizabeth Robison (Top 10)
Miss World
2005 - Ingrid Marie Rivera (2nd Runner-Up)
1994 - Joyce Giraud 
1993 - Ana Rosa Brito
Miss International
2016 - Gabriela Berrios 
2003 - Dignelis Jiménez 
1993 - Brenda Robles 
1992 - Dayanara Torres (Top 15)
1990 - Ana Rosa Brito 
1987 - Laurie Simpson (WINNER)
1986 - Elizabeth Robison (Top 15)
Miss Earth
2009 - Dignelis Jiménez
Miss Latin International US
2010 - Gabriela Berrios (WINNER)
Miss Tourism Intercontinental
2010 - Gabriela Berrios (WINNER)
Miss Supranational
2012 - Gabriela Berrios (Top 10)
Miss Grand International
2017 - Brenda Jiménez (3rd Runner-Up)
2016 – Madison Anderson (3rd Runner–Up)

Hostings

Other pageants

Miss Puerto Rico Scholarship Program

Up until 2016, Puerto Rico sent a delegate to the Miss America pageant. 2010 was the first time Puerto Rico had done so since 1961.

Representatives

References

External links
 Miss Universe Puerto Rico
 Miss Earth Puerto Rico
 El Podcast de Miss Puerto Rico Universe
 Miss Puerto Rico Scholarship

 
Puerto Rico
Puerto Rico
Puerto Rico
Beauty pageants in Puerto Rico
Puerto Rican culture
Recurring events established in 1952
Puerto Rican awards
1952 establishments in Puerto Rico